Largo do Machado is a square located on the border of the Catete, Flamengo and Laranjeiras neighborhoods in the city of Rio de Janeiro, Brazil.

References

Geography of Rio de Janeiro (city)
Squares in Rio de Janeiro